Alysardakh is the name of several rural localities in the Sakha Republic, Russia:
Alysardakh, Lensky District, Sakha Republic, a selo in Tolonsky Rural Okrug of Lensky District
Alysardakh, Verkhoyansky District, Sakha Republic, a selo in Adychchinsky Rural Okrug of Verkhoyansky District